Hoard is a surname. Notable people with the surname include:

Charles B. Hoard (1805–1886), U.S. Representative from New York
Greg Hoard, American journalist and author
James L. Hoard (1905–1993), American chemist, a member of the Manhattan Project
Jaylen Hoard (born 1999), French-American basketball player for Hapoel Tel Aviv of the Israeli Basketball Premier League
Leroy Hoard (born 1968), American football running back 
Samuel Hoard (1599–1658), English clergyman and controversialist in the Arminian interest
Samuel Hoard (politician) (1800–1889), American politician
William D. Hoard (1836–1918), 16th Governor of the U.S. state of Wisconsin